RC Academy Tbilisi is a Georgian professional rugby club from Tbilisi, who plays in the Didi 10, the Top division of Georgian rugby.

Current squad
2020/21                                                                                  

Akademia